David Mark Shucksmith  (born 1953) is Director of the Newcastle Institute for Social Renewal.

He was previously Professor of Town Planning at Newcastle University, and is also an adviser to the Joseph Rowntree Foundation "Action in Rural Areas" programme, a board member of the Countryside Agency, and Visiting Professor at the Centre for Rural Research at the University of Trondheim.

Before he was appointed to Newcastle University he was Professor of Land Economy at the University of Aberdeen.

Professor Shucksmith was appointed Officer of the Order of the British Empire (OBE) in the 2009 New Year Honours.

References

External links
 Staff page
 

British economists
Academics of Newcastle University
Academics of the University of Aberdeen
1953 births
Living people
Officers of the Order of the British Empire